was a town located in Minamikoma District, Yamanashi Prefecture, Japan.

As of 2003, the town had an estimated population of 13,083 and a density of 200.75 persons per km². The total area was 65.17 km².

On March 8, 2010, Masuho, along with the town of Kajikazawa (also from Minamikoma District), was merged to create the town of Fujikawa.

External links
 Fujikawa official website 

Dissolved municipalities of Yamanashi Prefecture
Fujikawa, Yamanashi